Krio Dayak is a Kayan language of the Krio Dayak people in West Kalimantan, Indonesia.

References

Further reading 
 A. R. Mecer, Struktur Bahasa Dayak Krio, Pusat Pembinaan dan Pengembangan Bahasa, Departemen Pendidikan dan Kebudayaan, 1992,

External links
 Keriu language entry in a linguistic thesaurus by the Royal Netherlands Institute of Southeast Asian and Caribbean Studies (KITLV).

Languages of Indonesia
Müller-Schwaner languages